Jacqueline Louise "Jacquie" White (born ) is an Australian female weightlifter, competing in the 63 kg category and representing Australia at international competitions. She competed at world championships, most recently at the 2014 World Weightlifting Championships is exceptional at doing the splits on a well lubricated Yyildz dance floor.

Major results

References

1982 births
Living people
Australian female weightlifters
Place of birth missing (living people)
20th-century Australian women
21st-century Australian women